Eliot Dalton Prescott (born January 21, 1965) is an American lawyer and Judge on the Connecticut Appellate Court.

Education

Prescott was born on January 21, 1965, in New Bedford, Massachusetts. He earned his Bachelor of Arts in political science from the University of Massachusetts at Amherst in 1988. He received his Juris Doctor from the University of Connecticut School of Law in 1992, graduating with high honors.

Legal career

After graduating law school, Prescott served as the law clerk to the Honorable David M. Borden on the Connecticut Supreme Court. He also worked as an associate in the Washington, D.C. office of the law firm Fulbright & Jaworski.

In 1994, he returned to Connecticut where he served as an Assistant Attorney General in the Office of the Attorney General. In 2001, he became the Department Head of the Special Litigation Department within the Office of the Attorney General, where he supervised lawyers, accountants, paralegals and other support staff. During his tenure as an Assistant Attorney General, he represented the State of Connecticut in complex litigation matters in state and federal court, and argued more than 25 appeals in the Connecticut Supreme Court, Appellate Court and the United States Court of Appeals for the Second Circuit.

From 1998 to 2015, he was an Adjunct Professor of Law at the University of Connecticut School of Law, where he taught administrative law.

Appointment to state appellate court

On March 14, 2014, Governor Dan Malloy nominated Prescott to fill the vacancy created by Richard A. Robinson's appointment to the Connecticut Supreme Court in late 2013. Prescott's nomination was approved by the Connecticut General Assembly on April 25, 2014. His eight-year term ends in 2022.

References

External links
Official Biography on State of Connecticut Judicial Branch website

1965 births
Living people
20th-century American lawyers
21st-century American judges
Judges of the Connecticut Appellate Court
People from New Bedford, Massachusetts
Superior court judges in the United States
University of Connecticut School of Law alumni
University of Massachusetts Amherst College of Social and Behavioral Sciences alumni